Inessa may refer to:
 Aetna (city) or Inessa, an ancient city of Sicily
 Inessa (skipper), a genus of skipper butterfly

People 
 Inessa Armand (1874–1920), French communist politician and feminist
 Inessa Galante (born 1954), Latvian soprano opera singer
 Inessa Korkmaz (born 1972), Russian volleyball player
 Inessa Konstantinova (1924–1944), Soviet wartime diarist and partisan
 Inessa Kravets (born 1966), Ukrainian triple jumper and long jumper
 Inessa Lee, American pop singer-songwriter
 Inessa Tarverdieva

Feminine given names